The 1923 Australian Championships was a tennis tournament that took place on outdoor Grass courts at the Milton Courts, Brisbane, Australia from 11 August to 18 August. It was the 16th edition of the Australian Championships (now known as the Australian Open), the third held in Brisbane, and the second Grand Slam tournament of the year. The singles titles were won by Pat O'Hara Wood and Margaret Molesworth.

Finals

Men's singles

 Pat O'Hara Wood defeated  Bert St John 6–1, 6–1, 6–3

Women's singles

 Margaret Molesworth defeated  Esna Boyd 6–1, 7–5

Men's doubles
 Pat O'Hara Wood /  Bert St. John defeated  Dudley Bullough /  Horace Rice 6–4, 6–3, 3–6, 6–0

Women's doubles
 Esna Boyd /  Sylvia Lance Harper  defeated  Margaret Molesworth /  Mrs. H. Turner 6–1, 6–4

Mixed doubles
 Sylvia Lance Harper  /  Horace Rice  defeated  Margaret Molesworth /  Bert St. John 2–6, 6–4, 6–4

External links
 Australian Open official website

 
1923 in Australian tennis
1923
August 1923 sports events